Prionomma atratum is a species of longhorn beetle native to Sri Lanka and India.

Description
Body is pitchy black. There are twelve segments in antenna and are smaller than body. Head, and gena completely covered by eyes, which are finely faceted not  divided. There is a deep sulcation between two eyes. Body surface is smooth and glossy. Scutellum is broad “U” shaped. Elytra elongated, which gradually narrowed towards  apex. Legs are robust, punctate and warty. In the genitalia, tip of the endophallus is triangular shaped with a very distinct black marking. 

The adult are frequently observed during June to July. Primarily a borer of stumps and decaying logs, the species known to make very large tunnels. The mature larva is over five inches long. Host plants of the larva include Abies pindrow, Abies webbiana, Juglans regia, Ficus excelsa, and Boswellia serrata.

References 

Cerambycinae
Insects of Sri Lanka
Insects of India
Insects described in 1789